State Road 246 (NM 246) is an  state highway in the US state of New Mexico. NM 246's western terminus is at U.S. Route 380 (US 380) in Capitan, and the eastern terminus is at US 70 and US 285 in Roswell.

History
NM 246 was created in the 1988 renumbering when NM 48 was shortened. Before 1988 it was the northernmost segment of NM 48.

Major intersections

See also

References

246
Transportation in Lincoln County, New Mexico
Transportation in Chaves County, New Mexico